WGY refers to several broadcasting stations in the United States.

In the New York Capital District, it refers to the following stations:
WGY (AM), a radio station on 810 kHz licensed to Schenectady, New York, United States
WGY-FM, a radio station on 103.1 MHz licensed to Albany, New York, United States
WRVE, an FM radio station on 99.5 MHz licensed to Schenectady, New York, United States, which held the callsign WGY-FM from 1988 to 1994.
WRGB, a television station on digital channel 6 licensed to Schenectady, New York, United States, which held the call sign WGY-TV from 1928 to 1942